Lee Yeo-Sung (born January 5, 1983) is a South Korean football player who since 2008 has played for Goyang KB Kookmin Bank FC (Suwon Samsung Bluewings, Busan I'Park and Daejeon Citizen).

References

External links
 

1983 births
Living people
South Korean footballers
Suwon Samsung Bluewings players
Korean Police FC (Semi-professional) players
Busan IPark players
Daejeon Hana Citizen FC players
Goyang KB Kookmin Bank FC players
K League 1 players
Korea National League players
Sportspeople from Incheon
Association football midfielders